Ettore Rivolta (3 September 1904 – 17 October 1977) was an Italian racewalker who competed at two editions of Olympic Games: 1932 Summer Olympics and 1936 Summer Olympics.

Biography
Rivolta was the bronze medalist in the 50 km race walk at the 1934 European Athletics Championships held in Turin. He also won the national championships at senior level five.

Achievements

National titles
Italian Athletics Championships
50 km walk: road: 1931, 1934, 1935, 1936, 1939

References

External links
 

1904 births
1977 deaths
Athletes (track and field) at the 1932 Summer Olympics
Athletes (track and field) at the 1936 Summer Olympics
Italian male racewalkers
Olympic athletes of Italy
European Athletics Championships medalists
20th-century Italian people